Ammasi Periasamy is an Indian American biophysicist who is a professor at the University of Virginia. He works on light microscopy, including the molecular imaging of living cells. He has developed a range of imaging systems, including confocal, multi-photon and fluorescence-lifetime imaging microscopy base devices.

Early life and education 
Periasamy was born in India. He trained at the University of Madras and the Indian Institutes of Technology. After earning his doctorate in 1984, Periasamy moved to the University of Washington for a postdoctoral research position.

Research and career 
Periasamy founded the W. M. Keck Centre for Cellular Imaging. His research considers the development of microscopy for imaging of living cells. He has designed various advanced modalities, including multi-photon and confocal approaches. In particular, Periasamy is interested in understanding protein-proetin interactions and the monitoring of physical parameters in cancer cells. Periasamy was one of the first researchers to demonstrate fluorescence-lifetime imaging microscopy (FLIM) and fluorescence lifetime redox ratio (FLIRR).

Selected publications

References 

Living people
Year of birth missing (living people)
University of Madras alumni
Indian Institutes of Technology alumni
Indian emigrants to the United States
University of Virginia faculty
American biophysicists
Indian biophysicists
20th-century American biologists
21st-century American biologists